Colubrina pedunculata is a shrub in the family Rhamnaceae. It is endemic to Christmas Island, an Australian territory in the north-eastern Indian Ocean.  Its specific epithet comes from the Latin pedunculatus, referring to the long and conspicuous peduncle of the inflorescence.

Description
Colubrina pedunculata is a thorny, sometimes straggling, shrub or small tree.  Its thorns are 5–20 mm long.  Its leaves are alternate, narrowly elliptic, and deciduous after fruiting.  It bears many yellow-green flowers, 5–6 mm across and clustered.  The fruit is about 7 mm long.

Distribution and habitat
Found only on Christmas Island, the plant is common on the northern and north-eastern terraces, in areas of poor, dry soil, among limestone pinnacles and scree, and in cliff edge thickets.

Relationships
Since it is closely related to the widespread C. asiatica (L.) Brongn., the fruit of which is used as a fish toxin, and the leaves of which are used medicinally to treat skin diseases, similar chemical or pharmacological properties may be expected in C. pedunculata.

References

Notes

Sources
 
 

pedunculata
Endemic flora of Christmas Island
Plants described in 1900
Taxa named by Edmund Gilbert Baker